The Marvin Norcross Award is awarded yearly in the Singing News Fan Awards ceremony to honor an individual selected by the staff of the Singing News magazine who has made distinct contributions to Southern gospel music over his or her career.

Honorees 
 1981: Carroll Stout
 1982: Wendy Bagwell, Wendy Bagwell and the Sunliters
 1983: Les Beasley, Florida Boys
 1984: Don Butler
 1985: W.B. Nowlin
 1986: Eldridge Fox, Kingsmen Quartet
 1987: Glen Payne and George Younce
 1988: Jack Pittman, Palmetto State Quartet
 1989: Roy Carter, Chuck Wagon Gang
 1990: Squire Parsons
 1991: Paul Heil
 1992: Bob Brumley
 1993: Jake Hess
 1994: James Blackwood, Blackwood Brothers
 1995: Buddy Liles, Florida Boys
 1996: Tim Riley, Gold City
 1998: Connie Hopper, The Hoppers
 1999: Archie Watkins, The Inspirations
 2000: Ed O'Neal, Dixie Melody Boys
 2001: Ruben Bean, The McKameys
 2002: Martin Cook, The Inspirations
 2003: Glen Allred, Florida Boys
 2004: Eddie & Janice Crook
 2005: Jackie & Elaine Wilburn

This award was not presented in the 1997, 2006, or 2007 Singing News Fan Awards.

As of 2008, the award was renamed the Norcross-Templeton Award.
 2008: Maurice Templeton, Singing News & Templeton Tours
 2009: Jerry Kirksey
 2010: Primitive Quartet
 2011: Peg McKamey Bean, The McKameys
 2012: Mike Holcomb, The Inspirations

Singing News Fan Awards for Marvin Norcross Award
Marvin Norcross Award